β-Guanidinopropionic acid, also referred to as guanidinopropionic acid, beta-guanidinopropionic acid or  β-GPA, is a dietary supplement.

β-Guanidinopropionic acid is a white crystalline powder soluble in water (50 mg/ml-clear, colorless solution).

Studies on animals (rats, monkeys, hamsters) show that acidic guanidine derivatives such as β-GPA can ameliorate hyperglycemia in animal models of noninsulin-dependent diabetes.

Though the oral availability of β-GPA is well established, the basic uptake mechanism has not been studied yet.

References

Guanidines
Carboxylic acids